The Ambassador of Australia to Estonia is an officer of the Australian Department of Foreign Affairs and Trade and the head of the Embassy of the Commonwealth of Australia to the Republic of Estonia. The Ambassador has a part-time presence in Tallinn, the capital of Estonia. From 1991 to 2018, Australia's relations with Estonia were the responsibility of the Australian Embassy in Stockholm.

The current ambassador, since October 2021, is Genevieve Clune.

List of ambassadors

Notes
 Embassy operates on a on a "pop-up" basis, with the ambassador resident in Tallinn for two months of the year and the embassy having a virtual presence for the remainder of the year. The Australian Embassy in Stockholm provides operational support.
 Also served concurrently as the resident Ambassador of Australia to Sweden, 1991–2018.
 Also served as non-resident Ambassador of Australia to Finland, 1968–2018.
 Also served as non-resident Ambassador of Australia to Norway, 1970–2003.
 Also served as non-resident Ambassador of Australia to Denmark, 1997–2000.
 Also served as non-resident Ambassador of Australia to Iceland, 1997–2000.
 Also served as non-resident Ambassador of Australia to Latvia, 1997–2018.
 Also served as non-resident Ambassador of Australia to Lithuania, 1997–2013.

See also
Australia–Estonia relations
Australia–Sweden relations

References

External links
Australian Embassy, Estonia

 
Estonia
Australia